An extranet is a controlled private network that allows access to partners, vendors and suppliers or an authorized set of customers – normally to a subset of the information accessible from an organization's intranet. An extranet is similar to a DMZ in that it provides access to needed services for authorized parties, without granting access to an organization's entire network.

Historically, the term was occasionally also used in the sense of two organizations sharing their internal networks over a virtual private network (VPN).

Enterprise applications
During the late 1990s and early 2000s, several industries started to use the term 'extranet' to describe centralized repositories of shared data (and supporting applications) made accessible via the web only to authorized members of particular work groups - for example, geographically dispersed, multi-company project teams. Some applications are offered on a software as a service (SaaS) basis.

For  example, in the construction industry, project teams may access a project extranet to share drawings, photographs and documents, and use online applications to mark-up and make comments and to manage and report on project-related communications. In 2003 in the United Kingdom, several of the leading vendors formed the Network for Construction Collaboration Technology Providers (NCCTP) to promote the technologies and to establish data exchange standards between the different data systems. The same type of construction-focused technologies have also been developed in the United States, Australia and mainland Europe.

Advantages
 Exchange large volumes of data using Electronic Data Interchange (EDI)
 Share product catalogs exclusively with trade partners
 Collaborate with other companies on joint development efforts
 Jointly develop and use training programs with other companies
 Provide or access services provided by one company to a group of other companies, such as an online banking application managed by one company on behalf of affiliated banks
improved efficiency: since the customers are satisfied with the information provided it can be an advantage for the organization where they will get more customers which  increases the efficiency.

Disadvantages
 Extranets can be expensive to implement and maintain within an organization  (e.g., hardware, software, employee training costs), if hosted internally rather than by an application service provider.
 Security of extranets can be a concern when hosting valuable or proprietary information.
 Partner and customer access may result in contentious or controversial debates

See also
LAN
List of collaborative software
Wide area network

References

Further reading

 Callaghan, J. (2002), Inside Intranets & Extranets: Knowledge Management and the Struggle for Power, Palgrave Macmillan, 
Stambro, Robert and Svartbo, Erik (2002),  Extranet Use in Supply Chain Management, University of Technology

Computer network security
Network architecture